The Delaware Democratic Party (DelDems) is the affiliate of the Democratic Party in the U.S. state of Delaware. It is headquartered in New Castle County and chaired by Erik Raser-Schramm.

The party is the dominant political party in Delaware and has existed since the Jacksonian Democrats broke away from the Federalists in 1825. Incumbent U.S. President Joe Biden is a Delaware Democrat, having served as a U.S. Senator from the state from 1973 to 2009, when he was inaugurated as vice president. The party also occupies all seats for the state in Congress, all statewide executive offices, and majorities in both houses of the state legislature. Historically a more centrist affiliate of the Democratic Party, the state party has recently become more progressive due to the movement's recent electoral successes against the centrist wing of the party.

History of the party

Party creation
As the first state to ratify the United States Constitution, Delaware was at the forefront of the creation in U.S. political parties. The origins of the Delaware Democratic Party can be traced back to the original anti-federalist party. While key difference divide this part from the Democratic Party today, key issues involving government involvement and ideologies such as Jeffersonian and Jacksonian can be linked to modern day ideals of the Delaware Democratic party. Despite being one of the first states with true parties, the spiritual predecessor of the Democratic party struggled to support its agenda in the state. It wasn't until the splitting of parties into federalists and Jacksonians that the Democratic party got its first true start. With only one bad loss in 1855 to the American Party, the Democratic Party dominated politics up until the end of Reconstruction in the United States. Most fascinating of all, was how the party maintained its popularity during the Civil War. Despite being a northern state, Delaware Democrats opposed the abolition of slavery and named themselves "the white man's party" as they fought the Republican congress during Reconstruction. With 36 years of election dominance, the Democrats eventually fell out of power due to the growth of industry in the state.

1900s-1940s
Following the ousting of the Democrats in both the federal and state sector, the Republican Party remained the dominant party throughout the early 1900s and up until World War II. Even when J. Edward Addicks attempted to illegally purchase the Republican seat in the U.S. Senate, the Democrats were unable to capitalize. From 1897 to 1936, Delaware Democrats held little power in politics with Republicans either dominating the state senate and house of Representatives, or the Democrats completely absent from federal politics. With the power of industry overriding agriculture, the Democratic Party was not be able to regain an equal footing in the state until Franklin D. Roosevelt came into office.

1950s-1990s
Following its period of weakness, the Democratic Party of Delaware began to regain an equal foothold with its Republican rival following World War II. Democrat Elbert N. Carvel served two terms as the governor of the state and helped keep his party relevant when they did not control the state legislature. The Democrats of the late 1970s to 2000 held an equal footing in the state, neither party gaining serious ground on the other. Democrats would end up holding the Governor position in the state for 30 years.

2000s-present

Initial regaining of power (2000s-mid 2010s) 
In the 21st century, the Democratic Party has risen to become the most popular party in Delaware. The party has control at the state level over the executive branch and the legislative branch. In 2000, incumbent Democratic Governor Tom Carper defeated Delaware's last Republican United States Senator to date, William Roth, by a 12-point margin. Incumbent Republican United States Representative Mike Castle retired in 2010 to run for U.S. Senate. The seat switched from Republican to Democratic when then-Lieutenant Governor John Carney won the seat that year, which was one of three congressional seats that Democrats gained in 2010.

Progressive movement and ideological factions (late 2010s-present) 
Preceding the late-2010s, the progressive faction of the Democratic Party held little power in Delaware politics, with the party being primarily dominated by the centrist and conservative wings. In 2018, incumbent centrist U.S. Senator Tom Carper faced an unexpected progressive primary challenge from Dover activist Kerri Evelyn Harris, who received 35% of the vote, which was the highest percentage against a statewide incumbent in 20 years.

In the 2020 state Democratic primaries, the progressive movement made unexpected significant gains on the state and local level. The most powerful Democrat in the Delaware Senate, President Pro Tempore David McBride, lost to challenger Marie Pinkney by nearly 5 points. Among other notable wins was progressive Eric Morrison's 22-point landslide defeat of conservative Democrat incumbent state representative Earl Jaques Jr., who faced controversy over homophobic comments he made towards Morrison, who is gay. Other progressive insurgents in the Delaware legislature in the 2020 primaries included Larry Lambert and Madinah Wilson-Anton. Progressive incumbent County Executive of New Castle County Matt Meyer also defeated his significantly funded centrist challenger by 13 points.

Following the progressive gains in the 2020 elections, bills advanced by the progressive faction to raise the Delaware minimum wage to $15 an hour, and the legalization of recreational marijuana were passed through the state legislature.  Governor John Carney signed the $15/hour minimum wage bill, but vetoed the legalization of recreational marijuana, for which he was heavily criticized by fellow Democrats. Progressive County Executive Matt Meyer wrote an open letter to the Delaware legislature encouraging them to override Carney's veto. During Carney's governorship, the progressive moment has managed to pressure more typically centrist Democrats to more liberal policy positions, mainly in reaction to Carney's comparitively conservative stances. Delaware Lieutenant Governor Bethany Hall-Long came out in support of legalizing recreational marijuana following Carney's veto announcement. Further criticism of Carney's stances by the progressive wing of the party have been for his support for capital punishment in certain cases. Attorney General Kathy Jennings stated that if the death penalty was reinstated in Delaware, she would refuse to enforce it. In the 2022 elections, progressive former U.S. Senate candidate Kerri Evelyn Harris won a seat to the Delaware House of Representatives.

Current elected officials
The following is a list of elected statewide and federal Democratic officeholders beginning in 2019:

Members of Congress
Democrats comprise all of Delaware's 3-member Congressional delegation - including both US Senators and the lone member of the House of Representatives.

U.S. Senate
Democrats have controlled both of Delaware's seats in the U.S. Senate since 2000:

U.S. House of Representatives
Democtats have controlled Delaware's lone seat in the U.S. House of Representatives since 2010:

Statewide officials
Democrats control all six statewide elected offices.

Treasurer: Colleen Davis
Auditor: Lydia York
Commissioner of Insurance: Trinidad Navarro

State legislative leaders
 Senate President: Bethany Hall-Long
Senate President Pro Tempore: David Sokola
Senate Majority Leader: Bryan Townsend
 Speaker of the House: Peter Schwartzkopf
House Majority Leader: Valerie Longhurst

Federal executive officials

In the 2008 U.S. Presidential election, Senator Joe Biden was elected Vice President of the United States alongside Illinois Senator Barack Obama, who was elected President of the United States. Biden is the first Delawarean to run on a presidential ticket, and the first Delawarean to be elected and hold the office. Biden assumed the Vice Presidency on January 20, 2009 and served until January 20, 2017.

In the 2020 U.S. Presidential election, Joe Biden was elected President of the United States alongside California Senator Kamala Harris, who was elected Vice President of the United States. He is the first Delawarean to be elected to the office of the President. He was sworn in on January 20, 2021.

Presidential electoral history 
Delaware voted for Democrats in the following elections:

 1852 - Former U.S. Senator Franklin Pierce
 1856 - Former U.S. Ambassador James Buchanan
 1864 - Former General George B. McClellan
 1868 - Former New York Governor Horatio Seymour
 1876 - New York Governor Samuel J. Tilden
 1880 - General Winfield Scott Hancock
 1884 - New York Governor Grover Cleveland
 1888 - Incumbent U.S. President Grover Cleveland
 1892 - Former U.S. President Grover Cleveland
 1912 - New Jersey Governor Woodrow Wilson
 1936 - Incumbent U.S. President Franklin D. Roosevelt
 1940 -  Incumbent U.S. President Franklin D. Roosevelt
 1944 - Incumbent U.S. President Franklin D. Roosevelt
 1960 - U.S. Senator John F. Kennedy
 1964 - Incumbent U.S. President Lyndon B. Johnson
 1976 - Former Georgia Governor Jimmy Carter
 1992 - Arkansas Governor Bill Clinton
 1996 - Incumbent U.S. President Bill Clinton
 2000 - U.S. Vice President Al Gore
 2004 - U.S. Senator John Kerry
 2008 - U.S. Senator Barack Obama
 2012 - Incumbent U.S. President Barack Obama
 2016 - Former U.S. Secretary of State Hillary Clinton
 2020 - Former U.S. Vice President Joe Biden

See also
Political party strength in Delaware
Delaware State Capitol
Delaware General Assembly
Delaware House of Representatives
Delaware Senate

References

External links
Delaware Democratic Party

 
Democratic Party (United States) by state
Political parties in Delaware